Saasen is a village in the municipality of Reiskirchen in Central Hesse, Germany. It includes the hamlets of Bollnbach, Veitsberg and Wirberg, a former castle.

Saasen station is on the Vogelsberg Railway. Saasen has a population of about 1100.

The settlement was first mentioned in a document in the year 1111.

The name of the village has changed over the centuries:
 in Sahsun (1111/1137)
 fon den Sassen (1249)
 de Sahsen (1251)
 de Sasen (1279)
 von den Sayssin (1379)

Division of the town

The village consists of 9 hamlets or settlements:
 Saasen centre (Mittelstadt)
 New housing estate
 Old village (Altstadt)
 Western village
 Eastern village
 Wirberg
 Stromberg
 Veitsberg
 Bollnbach

The village square
The village square in Saasen is surrounded by half-timbered buildings and the river Wieseck runs through it.

Bollnbach
Bollnbach is the biggest area of Saasen. Today, 48 people live in Bollnbach. In the middle of town is a Maibaum with all family names where the people live. Bollnbach has only two roads, the Wirbergerstraße and Saasenerstraße. In the middle of Bollnbach is also standing the "Schäferhaus" the main hall in Bollnbach.

Wirberg 
Wirberg is a former monastery located between Saasen and Göbelnrod.

Church of Veitsberg 
The Veitsberg Church is a Romanesque components and from the time received in 1250. Next to the church, in the former schoolhouse in the years 1734-1785, lived the "man of the calendar Veitsberg", the mathematically and scientifically versed Jacob Conrad Justus. He was here the village schoolmaster and taught the children of Saasen and Lindenstruth.

Wieseck
The river Wieseck originates in Saasen.

Geography
The village square of Saasen was established on the eastern bank of the Wieseck on a ridge of land backed by a steep hill. It is at this point and the spring of Wieseck. The site is located east of the main town in the valley on the Busecker tal and at the Wieseck in central Hesse.

Demographics
The village has been expanding in size quite considerably in recent years, with a population estimate of 1,200 in 2006, up over 60 from the census in 2001.

Sport 
The best known football club in Saasen is the sports club SV 1936 Saasen. SV Saasen has also other sections for bowling, gymnastics, and table tennis. Another known club is the youth academy. JSG Saasen/Harbach/Ettingshausen

Places of interest
 Church of Wirberg
 Wirberger view on Saasen
 Church of Veitsberg Saasen
 Little Lake
 Home museum Saasen (closed)
 Central of Saasen
 Half-timbered buildings
 Stadion am Wingert
 Old Train Station

Railway station
Saasen railway station is on the Vogelsberg Railway line from Giessen to Fulda).

References

External links 
Information on the settlement on the Reiskirchen website 
Saasen in the Hessian Regional History Information System (LAGIS) 

Villages in Hesse
Giessen (district)